Groveton may refer to a community in the United States:

 Groveton, New Hampshire
 Groveton, Texas
 Groveton, Virginia